Zoltán Kocsis (30 May 1952 – 6 November 2016) was a Hungarian pianist, conductor and composer.

Biography

Studies
Born in Budapest, he began his musical studies at the age of five and continued them at the Béla Bartók Conservatory in 1963, studying piano and composition. In 1968 he was admitted to the Franz Liszt Academy of Music, where he was a pupil of Pál Kadosa, Ferenc Rados and György Kurtág, graduating in 1973.

Career

He won the Hungarian Radio Beethoven Competition in 1970, and made his first concert tour of the United States in the following year. He received the Liszt Prize in 1973, and the Kossuth Prize in 1978.

Considered a great pianist, Kocsis performed with the Berlin Philharmonic, Chicago Symphony Orchestra, the San Francisco Symphony Orchestra, the New York Philharmonic, the Staatskapelle Dresden, the Philharmonia of London, and the Vienna Philharmonic.  Kocsis recorded the complete solo piano works and works with piano and orchestra of Béla Bartók. In 1990, his recording of Debussy's Images won "The Gramophone" Instrumental Award for that year. He won another with the violinist Barnabás Kelemen in 2013 in the chamber category for the recording of Bartók's Violin Sonatas Nos 1 & 2.

American critic Harold C. Schonberg praised Kocsis' extraordinary technique and fine piano tone. According to Grove Music Online, he had "an impressive technique, and his forthright, strongly rhythmic playing is nevertheless deeply felt and never mechanical. Kocsis has a natural affinity for Bach, but is also a fine exponent of contemporary music and has given the first performances of works by Kurtág."

Conductor
Kocsis co-founded with Iván Fischer the Budapest Festival Orchestra in 1983, thus opening a new epoch in the history of Hungarian orchestral playing.  Kocsis played a key role in the direction and the development of the program policy of the orchestra from its founding, and from 1987 also appeared as a conductor at their concerts.

He became the musical director of the Hungarian National Philharmonic in 1997 and held the title until his death in 2016.

Compositions
In addition to his compositions, Kocsis made piano transcriptions of works by Wagner, Rachmaninov, Bartók and Debussy. Kocsis completed the last act of Schoenberg's opera Moses und Aron, with the permission of Schoenberg's heirs, in 2010.

Personal life

He was married to pianist Adrienne Hauser from 1986. They had two children, Mark and Rita. In 1997 he married pianist Erika Tóth. They had a son, Krisztian, also a pianist, and a daughter, Viktoria.
Kocsis died following a long illness after undergoing heart surgery on 6 November 2016, aged 64, in his native Budapest.

Selected works

Opera
 Kopogtatások (1984–85)
 A vacsora (1984–85)
 Kiállítás (1984–85)

Orchestral and chamber music 
 Premiere,  for string orchestra (1976) 
 Fészek (1975–76)
 The last but one encounter (Utolsó előtti találkozás),  for piano and harpsichord (1981)
 33. December,  for chamber ensemble (1983)
 Memento,  for string orchestra (Chernobyl) (1986) 
 The last encounter (Utolsó találkozás) (1990)

References

Further reading

Obituaries

External links

Zoltán Kocsis biography
Zoltán Kocsis Page on Klassik Online 1998
Listing and reviews of Kocsis recordings
TV and Video Productions with Zoltán Kocsis – Directed by János S. Darvas
 Zoltán Kocsis biodata, 
 

1952 births
2016 deaths
Hungarian classical pianists
Male classical pianists
Hungarian conductors (music)
Male conductors (music)
Hungarian composers
Hungarian male composers
Franz Liszt Academy of Music alumni
Academic staff of the Franz Liszt Academy of Music
Members of the Széchenyi Academy of Literature and Arts